Cuatresia is a genus of flowering plants belonging to the family Solanaceae.

Its native range is Central and Southern Tropical America.

Species:

Cuatresia amistadensis 
Cuatresia anomala 
Cuatresia colombiana 
Cuatresia cuneata 
Cuatresia cuspidata 
Cuatresia exiguiflora 
Cuatresia foreroi 
Cuatresia fosteriana 
Cuatresia garciae 
Cuatresia glomeruflorula 
Cuatresia harlingiana 
Cuatresia hunzikeriana 
Cuatresia morii 
Cuatresia physalana 
Cuatresia plowmanii 
Cuatresia riparia 
Cuatresia trianae

References

Solanaceae
Solanaceae genera